Routes 1, 1B, and 2 (branded as The Bridges) are bus routes in Aberdeen operated by First Aberdeen.

History 
Route 1 was created to replace the "Bridges" Aberdeen Corporation Tramways route in the late 1950s. 

Route 2 was formerly numbered 21, it was renumbered in the 1960s. 

Service 1A, which offered an express service from Robert Gordon University Garthdee campus to the city centre, was withdrawn in March 2020. It was reintroduced on 20 February 2023.

Route 
Routes 1 and 2 are shared between the Bridge of Don and Great Southern Road. Route 1 takes a clockwise route through Garthdee, while route 2 takes an anti-clockwise route.

The route has suffered from overcrowding between Union Street and the RGU Garthdee campus with people at intermediate stops not being able to board at busy times.

Variations

References 

1
1